"Vuelve" (English: "Come Back") is a single by Puerto Ricans rappers Daddy Yankee and Bad Bunny from the former's upcoming studio album El Disco Duro. On September 29, 2017, El Cartel Records released "Vuelve" and its music video, directed by Daniel Durán. The song was written by Daddy Yankee, Bad Bunny, Carlos Ortíz, Luian Malavé, and Edgar and Xavier Semper, and was produced by Mambo Kingz and DJ Luian. Commercially, the song peaked at number six in the Dominican Republic and at number 11 on the US Hot Latin Songs chart.

Composition
"Vuelve" is a dark Latin trap-influenced song with a length of four minutes and forty-eight seconds. The lyrics has been described as "lack of love song" that tells the story of a man who tells his ex-girlfriend that he misses her and that he knows she misses him too, despite she being already with another man.

Commercial performance
"Vuelve" was released for digital stores and streaming platforms on September 29, 2017 by Daddy Yankee's label El Cartel Records under exclusive license to Universal Music Latin. It was the 88th best-performing single of 2017 in the US Hot Latin Songs chart. In Spain, the single peaked at number 17 and received a platinum certification by the Spanish Music Producers (PROMUSICAE) for units of over 40,000 sales plus track-equivalent streams.

Credits and personnel
Credits adapted from Tidal.

Bad Bunny – songwriting, lead vocals
Luian Malavé – producer, songwriting
Carlos Ortíz – songwriting
Xavier Semper – producer, songwriting
Edgar Semper – producer, songwriting
Daddy Yankee – songwriting, lead vocals

Charts

Weekly charts

Year-end charts

Certifications

|-

References

2017 songs
2017 singles
Daddy Yankee songs
Songs written by Daddy Yankee
Bad Bunny songs
Songs written by Bad Bunny
Songs written by Edgar Semper
Songs written by Xavier Semper